The Nagano at-large district (長野県選挙区, Nagano-ken senkyo-ku) is a multi-member constituency of the House of Councillors in the Diet of Japan. It consists of Nagano Prefecture and elects four Councillors, two every three years by single non-transferable vote (SNTV) for six-year terms.

The Councillors currently representing Nagano are:
 Yūichirō Hata (DPJ, Hata group; term ends in 2013), son of representative and former prime minister Tsutomu Hata and grandson of representative Bushirō Hata,
 Hiromi Yoshida (LDP, Nukaga faction; term ends in 2013),
 Kenta Wakabayashi (LDP; term ends in 2016), son and successor of councillor and former agriculture minister Masatoshi Wakabayashi, and
 Toshimi Kitazawa (DPJ, Hata group; term ends in 2016), son of former Nagano assemblyman Sadakazu (?, 貞一) Kitazawa.

Like most two-member districts Nagano often splits seats between the major parties; in the first decades of the 1955 System, a Socialist candidate usually received the highest vote.

Elected Councillors 

Party affiliations as of election day; #: resigned; †: died in office.

Recent election results

References 
House of Councillors: Alphabetical list of former Councillors

Nagano Prefecture
Districts of the House of Councillors (Japan)